Miles Ryan VC (1826 – January 1887) was an Irish recipient of the Victoria Cross, the highest and most prestigious award for gallantry in the face of the enemy that can be awarded to British and Commonwealth forces.

Ryan was about 31 years old, and a drummer in the 1st Bengal European Fusiliers during the Indian Mutiny when the following deed took place for which he and James McGuire were awarded the VC.

He died in Bengal, British India in January 1887.

References

The Register of the Victoria Cross (1981, 1988 and 1997)

Ireland's VCs  (Dept of Economic Development, 1995)
Monuments to Courage (David Harvey, 1999)
Irish Winners of the Victoria Cross (Richard Doherty & David Truesdale, 2000)

Irish recipients of the Victoria Cross
Military personnel from Derry (city)
1826 births
1887 deaths
19th-century Irish people
Irish soldiers in the British East India Company Army
Indian Rebellion of 1857 recipients of the Victoria Cross
British military musicians